The 1990–91 North Carolina Tar Heels men's basketball team represented the University of North Carolina from Chapel Hill, North Carolina.

Led by head coach Dean Smith, the tar heels completed yet another in a long line of impressive seasons, with a top five ranked team, and having reached all the way to the Final Four in the NCAA tournament.

Roster

Schedule

|-
!colspan=9 | Regular Season
|-

|-
!colspan=9 | ACC Tournament
|-

|-
!colspan=9 | NCAA Tournament
|-

Rankings

References

North Carolina Tar Heels men's basketball seasons
Tar
Tar
North Carolina
NCAA Division I men's basketball tournament Final Four seasons
North Carolina